Ashtadhatu, also called octo-alloy, is an alloy comprising the eight metals of gold, silver, copper, lead, zinc, tin, iron, and mercury, often used for casting metallic idols for Jain and Hindu temples in India.

The composition is laid down in the Shilpa Shastras, a collection of ancient texts that describe arts, crafts, and their design rules, principles and standards. Ashtadhatu is used because it is considered sattivik (virtuous or pure) in Hinduism, and does not decay, and it is also restricted to the production of images for the deities of Kubera, Vishnu, Krishna, Rama, Kartikeya, and the goddesses of Durga and Lakshmi. 

Its traditional composition, all eight metals are in equal proportion (12.5% each).

See also

References

Hindu iconography
Hindu symbols
Hindu worship